Infinity Studios was an American publisher of Japanese manga and Korean manhwa, publishing such series as Iono-sama Fanatics and Unbalance Unbalance.

Manhwa and manga distributed by Infinity Studios
Animal Paradise (manhwa)
Bambi (manhwa)
Blood Alone
Cafe Occult (manhwa)
Chun Rhang Yhur Jhun (manhwa)
Fighting!! Guidance (manhwa)
Hurrah! Sailor
Ichigeki Sacchu!! HoiHoi-san
Iono-sama Fanatics
A Kiss for my Prince (manhwa)
Menacing Dog's (manga)
Missing White Dragon (manhwa)
Na Na Na Na
Ninja Nonsense (Ninin Ga Shinobuden)
NOW (manhwa)
Popo Can
Sweety (manhwa)
Traveler of the Moon (manhwa)
Unbalance Unbalance (manhwa)
Witch Class (manhwa)
Zero (manhwa)
Zippy Ziggy (manhwa)

References

External links
 

Defunct book publishing companies of the United States
Defunct comics and manga publishing companies